Gibson County is a county in the southwestern part of the U.S. state of Indiana. As of the 2010 United States Census, the population was 33,503. The county seat is Princeton.

History
In 1787, the fledgling United States defined the Northwest Territory, which included the area of present-day Indiana. In 1800, Congress separated Ohio from the Northwest Territory, designating the rest of the land as the Indiana Territory. President Thomas Jefferson chose William Henry Harrison as the territory's first governor, and Vincennes was established as the territorial capital. After the Michigan Territory was separated and the Illinois Territory was formed, Indiana was reduced to its current size and geography. By December 1816 the Indiana Territory was admitted to the Union as a state.

Starting in 1794, Native American titles to Indiana lands were extinguished by usurpation, purchase, or war and treaty. The United States acquired land from the Native Americans in the 
1804 Treaty of Vincennes, which included the future Gibson County. Settlers had been pouring into the extreme southwest part of the Indiana Territory starting in 1789, and by 1813 there was sufficient to form a local governing body. The area included in present-day Gibson County had been first placed under the jurisdiction of Knox County, formed in 1790. Parts of that extremely large county were partitioned off in 1801 to create Clark, in 1808 to create Harrison, in 1810 to create Jefferson and Wayne, and in 1811 to create Franklin counties. On 1 April 1813 the Territorial legislature authorized partitioning a further large section of Knox to create Gibson County. The boundaries of this new county were reduced that same month (30 April 1813) to create Warrick; in 1814 to create Perry and Posey; in 1816 to create Pike; and finally in 1818 to create Vanderburgh counties.

The first white settler of the future Gibson County was John Severns, a native of Wales who had come with his parents to North America several years before the Revolutionary War. He settled in Gibson County in 1789–90 on the south bank of the Patoka River at a place now known as Severns Bridge. Another early Gibson County settler was William Hargrove, who came from Kentucky by pack mule in 1803; Captain Hargrove commanded a company of militia from Gibson County at the Battle of Tippecanoe in 1811.

The Rev. Joseph Milburn and his son Robert also arrived in 1803. They settled near Princeton, between the Patoka and White Rivers. The Milburns were from the area of Washington County, Kentucky. Rev. Milburn, a Baptist, established the first church; Robert established the first distillery in Indiana.

In 1805, Jacob Warrick arrived, along with his father-in-law, Thomas Montgomery. They burned out the last Native American village in 1807, chasing the inhabitants into the Illinois Territory. Captain Warrick was killed at the Battle of Tippecanoe in 1811.

Gibson County was named for John Gibson, an officer in the French and Indian War and the Revolutionary War. Gibson was Secretary of the Indiana Territory, serving as acting Governor on two occasions. The two counties of Gibson County and Warrick County, separated by Rector's Base Line, were formed March 9, 1813. Gibson County was organized on April 1, 1813, while Warrick County was organized on April 30, meaning that both territories fell under Gibson County for that nearly two-month period. Gibson County occupied everything from the Wabash River and from the White River's extension to the Paoli Base Line down the 2d Principal Meridian to the Rector's Base Line. The area south of this line became Warrick County, which covered the area from the 2d Principal Meridian west to the Wabash River and down the Wabash River and with meanders up the Ohio River back to the 2d Principal Meridian (which had separated Knox County from Harrison County, Indiana Territory). Orange County,  Spencer County, Pike County, Dubois County, and Crawford County all came from the roughly  area occupied by the original Gibson County, as well as small portions of Lawrence County, Perry County, Posey County, the current Warrick County, and Vanderburgh County.

When the county was organized, Patoka was intended to be the county seat. However, although Princeton contends it was the only county seat, some contend county records indicate Owensville was a temporary county seat since Princeton was not laid out until late 1814, at least a year after Gibson County's organization.

Abolitionists
Although Indiana was technically a "free state," those assisting runaway slaves were guilty of breaking the law and could be prosecuted and jailed. Despite the legal threats, the Abolitionist movement was strong in Gibson County where many were active in the Underground Railroad, some openly known as Abolitionists such as David Stormont and his wife who maintained a station at their home three miles northwest of Princeton, along with John Carithers who aided runaway slaves at his home east of Princeton, Sarah Merrick, Princeton, was jailed (after she was unable or unwilling to pay her $500 bail) in Gibson County for helping a runaway slave and her children from nearby Henderson, Kentucky (where slavery was legal), to escape to free territory. Reverend Thomas B. McCormick, a Presbyterian minister, was so well known as an Abolitionist that he fled to Canada after the Kentucky governor requested his extradition. Joseph Hartin of Princeton politically identified himself as an Abolitionist. James Washington Cockrum, originally from North Carolina, maintained a station at his home in Oakland City, first hiding runaways in a root cellar at his log cabin. His son William, who later authored History of the Underground railroad as it was conducted by the Anti-slavery league; including many thrilling encounters between those aiding the slaves to escape and those trying to recapture them, aided him helping the runaway slaves. Their family home in Oakland City, known as Cockrum Hall, is located on the grounds of present-day Oakland City University and is recognized as a prominent station on the Underground Railroad.

Geography
 
Nearly 90% of the county exists within the Ohio River Valley American Viticultural Area along with all of neighboring Posey, Vanderburgh and Warrick counties and a portion of Pike County. Despite being close to Evansville and experiencing a large growth of population in the central areas, Gibson County still remains a largely rural county with half of its townships having populations less than 2,000. Less than 7 percent of the county's  lies within incorporated settlements, or 10 percent if subdivisions are included.

The western part of the county consists largely of spread-out flood-prone farms with spotty marshes along the Wabash and White Rivers. There are rolling hills around Owensville, and large forest and marshland tracts lie near the Gibson Generating Station and the three river settlements of Crawleyville, East Mount Carmel, and Skelton. The northern part is near the White River and is more given to hills and forest. The eastern part contains many hills and is also dotted with strip pits and active coal mines. The southern part is more given to valley and marshland, drained by the Pigeon Creek which flows south through Evansville.

Even without Interstate 69, the county is within a day's drive of Chicago, Cincinnati, Chattanooga, Columbus, Indianapolis, Louisville, Memphis, Nashville, Springfield, St. Louis, even South Bend, and Fort Wayne despite the lack of freeway connection. There are two major intersections in the southern extremes of the county: the intersection of Interstate 64 and US 41; and the intersection of Interstates I-64 and I-69, which will eventually link the county and Evansville to Indianapolis and Memphis and make a day trip to even Detroit possible.

The western half of the Patoka River National Wildlife Refuge and Management Area lies within Gibson County.

Adjacent counties

 White County, Illinois − west
 Wabash County, Illinois − northwest
 Knox County − north
 Pike County − east
 Warrick County − southeast
 Vanderburgh County - south
 Posey County - southwest

Cities (with ZIP codes)

Towns (with ZIP codes)

 Buckskin (47647)
 Fort Branch (47648)
 Francisco (47649)
 Haubstadt (47639)
 Hazleton (47640)
 Mackey (47654)
 Owensville (47665)
 Patoka (47666)
 Somerville (47683)

Unincorporated communities

 Baldwin Heights *
 Buena Vista (Giro)
 Crawleyville
 Calamity
 Dongola
 Douglas
 Durham
 East Mount Carmel
 Gray Junction
 Gudgel
 Hickory Ridge (Hickory)
 Johnson
 Kings Station (Kings)
 Lyles Station
 McGary
 Mount Olympus
 Mounts
 Northbrook Hills *
 Oak Hill
 Oatsville
 Port Gibson
 Saint James
 Skelton (now under Gibson Lake)
 Snake Run
 Warrenton
 Wheeling (Kirkville)
 White River

* Baldwin Heights and Northbrook Hills are within the city limits of Princeton.

Townships
Gibson County consists of ten townships:

 Barton
 Center
 Columbia
 Johnson
 Montgomery
 Patoka
 Union
 Wabash
 Washington
 White River

Climate and weather

Demographics

2020 census
As of the 2020 United States Census, the population of Gibson County was 33,011.

2010 census
As of the 2010 United States Census, there were 33,503 people, 13,255 households, and 9,168 families in the county. The racial makeup of the county was 95.5% white, 1.8% black or African American, 0.5% Asian, 0.2% American Indian, 0.5% from other races, and 1.6% from two or more races. Those of Hispanic or Latino origin made up 1.3% of the population. In terms of ancestry, 28.3% were German, 24.3% were American, 13.1% were Irish, and 11.7% were English.

Of the 13,255 households, 32.3% had children under the age of 18 living with them, 55.0% were married couples living together, 9.7% had a female householder with no husband present, 30.8% were non-families, and 26.5% of all households were made up of individuals. The average household size was 2.47 and the average family size was 2.98. The median age was 39.9 years.

The median income for a household in the county was $47,697 and the median income for a family was $61,652. Males had a median income of $43,271 versus $28,424 for females. The per capita income for the county was $22,542. About 7.6% of families and 12.2% of the population were below the poverty line, including 16.1% of those under age 18 and 9.8% of those age 65 or over.

Government and politics

The county government is a constitutional body granted specific powers by the Constitution of Indiana, and by the Indiana Code.

The county council is the fiscal branch of the county government and controls spending and revenue collection in the county. Representatives are elected to four-year terms from county districts. They set salaries, the annual budget, and special spending. The council has limited authority to impose local taxes, including income and property taxes (which are subject to state-level approval), excise taxes, and service taxes.

The Board of Commissioners is the legislative and executive body of the county government. The commissioners are elected county-wide, in staggered four-year terms. One commissioner serves as president. The commissioners execute acts legislated by the council, collect revenue, and manage the county government.

The county maintains two court systems, Circuit Court and Superior Court. Judges are elected to a term of six years and must be a member of the Indiana Bar Association. In some cases, court decisions can be appealed to the state level circuit court.

The county has other elected offices, including Sheriff, Coroner, Auditor, Treasurer, Recorder, Surveyor, Assessor, and Circuit Court Clerk. These officers are elected to four-year terms. Members elected to county government positions are required to declare party affiliations and to be residents of the county.

Gibson County is part of Indiana's 8th congressional district; Indiana Senate districts 48 and 49; and Indiana House of Representatives districts 64, 75 and 76.

Overall Gibson County has been a Republican stronghold in national politics. In contrast, Democrats tend to be strong on county-level politics. Princeton accounts for the majority of consistent Democratic support within the county, whereas outside of Princeton, particularly South Gibson is where the consistent Republican support is found.

Recent disasters

2004 snowstorm
In December 2004, a crippling snowstorm dumped over twice the normal annual snowfall in three days. Interstate 64 was closed. The Indiana National Guard was dispatched and local farmers were recruited to help stranded motorists.

2005 flood
Extreme flooding occurred throughout the county and high school students from many counties assisted the Indiana National Guard in shoring up levees and sandbagging towns. Hazleton was evacuated because its levee was showing signs of fatigue; however, the levees held. By the end of January 2005, the rivers had receded enough to allow people to return to their homes. Over 100 homes were lost in the flood, which was considered the second-worst flood in the area's history (after the Great Flood of 1913).

2008 earthquake

With a moment magnitude of 5.2 and a maximum Mercalli intensity of VII, the 2008 Illinois earthquake was one of the largest instrumentally recorded earthquakes in Illinois. It occurred at 4:37:00 a.m. CDT (9:37:00 UTC) on April 18 within the Wabash Valley Seismic Zone at a depth of 11.6 km. It was centered near West Salem, Illinois and Mount Carmel, Illinois, specifically at 38.45° N, 87.89° W.

2008 flood

A major flood occurred in June 2008, caused by intense rainfall upstream. Both the Wabash and White Rivers were severely flooded and nearly all of Gibson County's levees held the flood back, while many levees upstream were failing.

2017 tornado

On the evening of February 28, 2017, a powerful EF3 tornado struck areas of southern Illinois and Southwest Indiana. It began near Crossville, Illinois where it caused one death, then continued northeast, crossing the Wabash River into Posey County where it caused mainly tree and relatively minor structure damage, the tornado then continued its track east-northeast into southern Gibson County where the most intense damage occurred between Owensville and Cynthiana. Two people received minor injuries there. The tornado continued, causing damage along the way, with severe damage being concentrated along Indiana 168 and to several facilities along the southern end of the TMMI complex until ending south of Oakland City, after tracking 44 miles.

Transportation

County roads
Like most Indiana counties, Gibson County uses the Indiana county road system to identify its roads. U.S. Route 41 (a north–south road) and State Road 64 (an east–west road) are near the meridian and division lines for the county, respectively.

Major highways

Interstate 69

A section of Interstate 69's construction groundbreaking occurred on July 16, 2008, at the Centre in Evansville. This project has its controversy, highlighted by a group of protesters in attendance. A portion of the first segment opened in September 2009. The entire stretch of highway in Gibson County was open to traffic on November 15, 2012.

Railroads
Three railroad lines pass through the county. CSX Transportation operates a north–south line, and Norfolk Southern Railway operates an east–west line; they intersect in Princeton. The north–south Indiana Southern Railroad main line intersects the Norfolk Southern line at Oakland City.

Sports
Gibson County's association with baseball is far-reaching with noted Major League Baseball players and announcers such as Gary Denbo and Dave Niehaus, and most notably MLB hall of famer Edd Roush and MLB legend Gil Hodges, the namesake of Gil Hodges Field, a little league field in Princeton.

Gibson County made its mark on the High School scene with two softball titles by Gibson Southern and a double overtime Boys Basketball State Title by Princeton in 2009, completing a 29–0 season as well as PCHS now holding the All-time points record with Jackie Young as of 2016 and a 2015 Girls Basketball State Title. In addition there are three State Runner-Up Titles. All of these titles have been acquired since Gibson Southern's Softball Runner-Up Title in 2001.

Education

Gibson County's three municipal school districts
East Gibson School Corporation – Oakland City:
 Waldo J. Wood Memorial Jr/Sr High School – Oakland City (Trojans)
 Oakland City Elementary School – Oakland City (Acorns)
 Francisco Elementary School – Francisco (Owls)
 Barton Township School – Mackey (Aces)

North Gibson School Corporation – Princeton:
 Princeton Community High School – Princeton (Tigers)
 Princeton Community Middle School – Princeton (Tigers)
 Brumfield Elementary School (formerly the "Early Learning Center") – Princeton (Tiger Cubs)

South Gibson School Corporation – Fort Branch:

 Gibson Southern High School – Fort Branch (Titans)
 Fort Branch Community School (K-8) – Fort Branch (Twigs)
 Haubstadt Community School (K-8) – Haubstadt (Elites)
 Owensville Community School (K-8) – Owensville (Kickapoos)

Private education
Gibson County's Private Education consists of four Catholic Schools run by the Roman Catholic Diocese of Evansville and one non-Catholic Christian school. Holy Cross, St. James, and Bethel field basketball teams. Enrollment and Grades are in the 1st parentheses. Mascot (I/A) is in 2nd parentheses.
 Bethel Christian School – Princeton (K3-8:112) (Crusaders)
 Holy Cross Catholic School – Fort Branch (K-5:111) (Crusaders)
 St. James Catholic School – St. James/Haubstadt (K-8:185) (Cougars)
 St. Joseph Catholic School – Princeton (K-5:185)
 St.s Peter & Paul Catholic School – Haubstadt (K-5:200)

Higher education
 Oakland City University – Oakland City, Private university
 Vincennes University Workforce Training Center – Princeton Branch – On southwest corner of Gibson County Courthouse
 Vincennes University Center for Advanced Manufacturing – located near Fort Branch Community School at U.S. 41 and Coal Mine Road (CR 800 South). Groundbreaking was on October 23, 2009, with Construction starting on November 3, 2009. Workforce programs offered at the Gibson County Center include certified miner safety training and heavy equipment operator training. In February 2016, in cooperation with North American Crane Certifications (NACC), this facility became an official training and testing site for Crane Institute Certification (CIC).

Businesses

Industry
 Gibson Generating Station (Coal), Owensville (across IN-64 from East Mount Carmel and across the Wabash River from Mount Carmel, Illinois, 7 miles northwest of Owensville and 10 miles west of Princeton).
 Toyota Motor Manufacturing Indiana (TMMI), Princeton (located almost exactly halfway between Princeton and Fort Branch and largely in Union Township but addressed to Princeton.)  Produces the Toyota Highlander, Toyota Sienna, and the Toyota Sequoia.
 Hansen Corporation, Princeton (located on the south side)
 Millennium Steel, Princeton (Located Immediately north of Toyota). Visited by President Barack Obama on October 3, 2014.
 Vuteq, Princeton (Located at north east corner of Toyota Plant Complex).
Also has a warehouse complex southeast of the Toyota Plant.
 Toyota Boshoku Indiana (TBIN), formerly TISA (Total Interior Systems of America), Princeton (Located at north end of the Industrial Park on Gach Road).
 Peabody Energy, Francisco Mine (Formerly Black Beauty Coal Co.) (Located north of Francisco, IN).
 Gibson County Coal, Operates a large mine northwest of Princeton, a service mine 7 miles west of Princeton, and a mine north of Owensville.
 Norfolk Southern Railway
 CSX Transportation
Proposed Industry or Industry under construction 

Broadcast media
 FM 98.1 WRAY-FM – Princeton   – Country Music
 FM 101.5 WBGW-FM – Fort Branch – Religious Music/Talk
 AM 1250 WRAY – Princeton   – News/Talk

Newspapers
 Gibson County Today     – Princeton
 Princeton Daily Clarion – Princeton
 Oakland City Journal    – Oakland City
 South Gibson Star-Times – Owensville, Fort Branch, and Haubstadt
 South Gibson Bulletin   – Owensville, Fort Branch, and Haubstadt

Recreation

 Gibson County Fairgrounds – Princeton – site of Indiana's oldest county fair, started in 1852.
 Azalea Path Arboretum and Botanical Gardens (Located South of Mt Olympus on the Gibson/Pike County Line)
 Oakland City New Lake – Oakland City
 Lafayette Park – Princeton
 Gil Hodges Field – Princeton
 Camp Carson YMCA Campground – Princeton
 Haubstadt Old School Park and Old Gym – Haubstadt
 Tri-State Speedway – Haubstadt
 Weather Rock Campground – Warrenton
 Montgomery Park – Owensville
 REH Center (Old Owensville Gym) – Owensville
 Gibson Lake – Owensville
 Marlette Park – Fort Branch
 Old Gym – Fort Branch
 City Park of Fort Branch
 Gibson Southern High School Grounds – Fort Branch
 Patoka River National Wildlife Refuge and Management Area – Francisco and Oakland City
 Hemmer Woods State Nature Preserve – Southeast of Mackey

See also
 National Register of Historic Places listings in Gibson County, Indiana
 Grand Rapids Hotel
 Grand Rapids Dam
 Thomas S. Hinde
 Charles T. Hinde

References
Specific

General

External links

 
 Gibson County Now 

 
Indiana counties
1813 establishments in Indiana Territory
Populated places established in 1813
Southwestern Indiana